Haplochromis rufus is a species of cichlid endemic to Lake Victoria where it is found over rocky substrates in the southern portion of the lake.  This species can reach a length of  SL.  This species may be placed back in the genus Lithochromis when a comprehensive review of Haplochromis is carried out.

References

rufus
Fish of Tanzania
Fish described in 1998
Fish of Lake Victoria
Taxonomy articles created by Polbot